KOPY-FM (92.1 FM) is a radio station licensed to Alice, Texas, United States, the station serves the Kingsville-Alice-Falfurrias area.  The station is currently owned by Claro Communications, Ltd.

History
The station was assigned the call letters KDSI on January 13, 1982.  On June 3, 1985, the station changed its call sign to the current KOPY-FM. On August 5, 1991 to KQNN, on April 1, 1996 to KOPY, on August 23, 1996 to the current KOPY-FM,

References

External links
 
 

OPY-FM